Holdman is a surname. Notable people with the surname include:

Tom Holdman, (born 1970), American glass artist
Travis Holdman, American politician
Warrick Holdman (born 1975), American football player

See also
Holdman, Oregon, unincorporated community in the United States